The Friant class comprised three protected cruisers of the French Navy built in the early 1890s; the three ships were , , and . They were ordered as part of a naval construction program directed at France's rivals, Italy and Germany, particularly after Italy made progress in modernizing its own fleet. The plan was also intended to remedy a deficiency in cruisers that had been revealed during training exercises in the 1880s. As such, the Friant-class cruisers were intended to operate as fleet scouts and in the French colonial empire.

Friant and Chasseloup-Laubaut initially served with the Northern Squadron, while Bugeaud operated in the cruiser force of the Mediterranean Squadron, France's main battle fleet. Bugeaud became the flagship of the Levant Division in 1898, which operated as part of the International Squadron that intervened in the Cretan Revolt of 1897–1898. All three members of the class were sent to East Asia in response to the Boxer Uprising in Qing China by 1901, and they remained in the region through the mid-1900s. Bugeaud was badly worn out by her time in the Far East, and she was sold for scrap in 1907. That year, Chasseloup-Laubat visited the United States during the Jamestown Exposition.

Chasseloup-Laubat was reduced to a storage hulk in 1911, but Friant remained in active service through the start of World War I in August 1914. She operated with cruiser squadrons patrolling for German commerce raiders early in the war and was later sent to patrol the formerly-German colony of Kamerun. Chasseloup-Laubat was converted into a distilling ship to support the main French fleet at Corfu while Friant ended the war having been rebuilt into a repair ship. The latter vessel was sold for scrap in 1920, while Chasseloup-Laubat ultimately foundered in 1926 after having been abandoned in the bay of Nouadhibou, French Mauritania.

Background

These developments provoked a strong response in the French press. The Budget Committee in the French Chamber of Deputies began to press for a "two-power standard" in 1888, which would see the French fleet enlarged to equal the combined Italian and German fleets, then France's two main rivals on the continent. This initially came to nothing, as the supporters of the  doctrine called for a fleet largely based on squadrons of torpedo boats to defend the French coasts rather than an expensive fleet of ironclads. This view had significant support in the Chamber of Deputies.

The next year, a war scare with Italy led to further demands to strengthen the fleet. The visit of a German squadron of four ironclads to Italy compounded French concerns about a combined Italo-German fleet that would dramatically outnumber their own. Training exercises held in France that year demonstrated that the slower French fleet would be unable to prevent the faster Italian squadron from bombarding the French coast at will, in part because it lacked enough cruisers (and doctrine to use them) to scout for the enemy ships.

To correct the weaknesses of the French fleet, on 22 November 1890, the Superior Naval Council authorized a new construction program directed not at simple parity with the Italian and German fleets, but numerical superiority. In addition to twenty-four new battleships, a total of seventy cruisers were to be built for use in home waters and overseas in the French colonial empire. The Friant class were the first group of protected cruisers to be authorized under the program.

Design

On 28 March 1890, the French naval minister, Édouard Barbey, requested a new design for an improved version of the cruiser  from Delphin Albert Lhomme, the supervisor of construction at Toulon. The new ship was to be larger, which would permit several improvements over the earlier ship, including a longer cruising radius, more powerful armament, and improved armor protection. The ship would have a minimum speed of  under normal conditions and  using forced draft. To these specifications, Lhomme added a secondary battery of four  guns.

During a meeting on 28 October, the  approved the design, but significant revisions were to follow as work on the vessels began. Already on 17 November, Barbey ordered that the originally planned M1881/84 pattern of 164.7 mm gun was to be replaced with the newly designed M1891 pattern, which had a longer barrel and were fitted with gun shields. These improvements made the guns heavier, which in turn necessitated alterations to the superstructure to reduce topweight. As the ships neared completion, the naval minister, Auguste Alfred Lefèvre, made the decision on 12 March 1894 to cut down the originally intended military masts and replace the upper portion with lighter pole masts. The fighting top was to be retained, but it was determined that it would have to be removed to improve stability, which Gustave Besnard, by then the naval minister, ordered on 16 February 1895. He also instructed the shipyards to delete the originally planned torpedo tubes from the stern and broadside positions, leaving only a pair of tubes in the bow.

They were fitted with three different types of water-tube boilers to compare their performance in service. They all proved to be somewhat of a disappointment, as all three could not match Davout in speed despite having greater horsepower. This was primarily the result of poor combustion in the boilers, particularly the Niclausse boilers installed aboard Friant. The ships' hull form, while inspired by Davouts, had poor lines at the bow that caused the ships to trim down by around  when cruising at high speeds. Additionally, weights in the ships were poorly distributed along their length, which contributed to poor handling.

General characteristics and machinery

They displaced  as designed. The ships' hulls featured a pronounced ram bow (that was not reinforced for use in ramming attacks) and a tumblehome shape, which were common characteristics of major French warships of the period. They had a forecastle deck that extended for almost the entire length of the ship, terminating with a short quarterdeck aft and a sloped stern. Their superstructure consisted of a main conning tower with a bridge forward and a smaller, secondary conning tower aft. Each ship was originally to be fitted with a pair of heavy military masts with fighting tops, but stability problems with Friant forced them to be replaced with lighter pole masts carrying only observation positions. Steering was controlled by a single rudder. Chasseloup-Laubat was fitted with bilge keels to improve her stability. Their crew consisted of 331 to 339 officers and enlisted men.

The ships' propulsion system consisted of a pair of 3-cylinder, triple-expansion steam engines driving two screw propellers. Steam was provided by twenty coal-burning water-tube boilers of the Niclausse type for Friant and the Lagrafel d'Allest type for Chasseloup-Laubat, while Bugeaud received twenty-four Belleville boilers. All of the ships' boiler rooms were ducted into three funnels.

Armament and armor

The ships were armed with a main battery of six  45-caliber guns. They were placed in individual pivot mounts; one was on the forecastle, two were in sponsons abreast the conning tower, another pair were in sponsons just forward of the aft conning tower, and the last was on the stern.

The ships' offensive armament was augmented by a secondary battery of four  Modèle 1891 guns, which were carried in pivot mounts in the conning towers, one on each side per tower. All of the primary and secondary guns were fitted with gun shields to protect their crews. The offensive weaponry was rounded out by two  torpedo tubes that were carried in their hulls above the waterline, one on either side.

For close-range defense against torpedo boats, they carried a battery of numerous small-caliber, quick-firing guns. This comprised four  3-pounder Hotchkiss guns and eleven  1-pounder guns, all in individual mounts. The former were carried in pairs in the forward and aft conning towers on the upper deck; the latter were distributed around the ships, including atop the sponsons for the main guns and higher in the superstructure.

Above the deck at the sides, a cofferdam filled with cellulose was intended to contain flooding from damage below the waterline. Below the main deck, a thin splinter deck covered the propulsion machinery spaces to protect them from shell fragments.

Construction

Service history

Friant and Chasseloup-Laubat spent their first years in service assigned to the Northern Squadron, based in the English Channel. Bugeaud was instead assigned to the Mediterranean Squadron, France's primary battle fleet. In both units, the ships were primarily occupied with training exercises. In 1898, Bugeaud transferred to serve as the flagship of the Levant Division in the eastern Mediterranean. During that time, she participated in the International Squadron, composed of ships from several of the Great Powers, that intervened in the Cretan Revolt of 1897–1898.

Bugeaud was deployed to East Asia by early 1900 in response to the Boxer Uprising, and the other two members of the class had followed her there by 1901, and they remained in the region after the conflict ended. After returning to France in the mid-1900s, Friant received new boilers and thereafter returned to fleet operations. Meanwhile, the poor shipyard facilities in the Far East prevented sufficient maintenance being done for Bugeaud, and she was in a poor state by 1907. Unable to economically repair her, the French Navy struck the ship from the naval register and sold her for scrap. That year, Chasseloup-Laubat took part in a visit to the United States for the Jamestown Exposition. She was later hulked in 1911 and disarmed in 1913.

At the start of World War I in August 1914, Friant was on station in France's colonies in the Americas. She was initially assigned to a cruiser squadron to patrol the western end of the English Channel. In September, she was moved to French Morocco to join a group of cruisers patrolling for German commerce raiders. At some point after the start of the conflict, Chasseloup-Laubat was converted into a distilling ship to support the main French fleet at Corfu. Friant was later moved to the Gulf of Guinea to patrol Germany's colony of Kamerun in western Africa. She ended the war having been converted into a repair ship based in Morocco and later at Mudros to support a flotilla of submarines. She was struck from the naval register in 1920 and sold to ship breakers. Chasseloup-Laubat was sent to Port Etienne, French Mauritania, to supply the colony with water and eventually sank in 1926 in the bay of Nouadhibou after having been abandoned.

Notes

References

 
 
 
 
 
 
 
 
 
 
 
 
 
 
 
 
 
 
 
 
 
 

 
Cruiser classes
Ships built in France
World War I cruisers of France
Ship classes of the French Navy